Sanaâ Mssoudy (born 30 December 1999) is a Moroccan footballer who plays as a forward for ASFAR and the Morocco women's national team.

Club career
Mssoudy has played for ASFAR in Morocco, appearing at the 2021 CAF Women's Champions League final tournament.

International career

See also
List of Morocco women's international footballers

References

External links

1999 births
Living people
Moroccan women's footballers
Women's association football forwards
Morocco women's international footballers